Stony Man is an unincorporated community in Page County, in the U.S. state of Virginia. It was also known as Blossersville.

References

Unincorporated communities in Virginia
Unincorporated communities in Page County, Virginia
Coal towns in Virginia